Take Out is a 2004 independent film depicting a day-in-the-life of an undocumented Chinese immigrant working as a deliveryman for a Chinese take-out shop in New York City. Written and directed by Shih-Ching Tsou and Sean Baker, the film was nominated for the John Cassavetes Award in the 2008 Independent Spirit Awards.

Plot

Take Out is a day-in-the-life of Ming Ding, an undocumented Chinese immigrant working as a deliveryman for a Chinese take-out shop in New York City. Ming is behind with payments on his huge debt to the smugglers who brought him to the United States. The collectors have given him until the end of the day to deliver the money that is due. After borrowing most of the money from friends and relatives, Ming realizes that the remainder must come from the day's delivery tips. In order to do so, he must make more than double his average daily income.

Cast

Style
In a social-realist style, the camera follows Ming on his deliveries throughout the upper Manhattan neighborhood where social and economic extremes exist side by side. Intercutting between Ming's deliveries and the daily routine of the restaurant, Take Out presents a harshly real look at the daily lives of illegal Chinese immigrants in New York City.

Production notes

Take Out was filmed in and near upper-Manhattan, New York, in the spring of 2003 on a budget of $3000. The film was shot on digital video due to both the cinema vérité style and a non-existent budget with an ensemble cast of both professional and nonprofessional actors while shooting without a full crew in an actual take-out restaurant during operating hours.

Release 
Take Out debuted at the Slamdance Film Festival in January 2004. The film had already been screened in over 25 film festivals when lawyers representing Baker and Tsou sent a cease and desist letter to filmmaker Seth Landau who was planning to release a film with the same name. The case went into arbitration under rules of the Motion Picture Association of America in November 2005.

The film was not given a limited release through CAVU Pictures until 2008. On September 1, 2009, Kino Entertainment released Take Out in the US on a Region 1 DVD. In September 2022, the film was given a Blu-ray release as part of the Criterion Collection.

Reception

Accolades 
Take Out was nominated for the John Cassavetes Award at the 2008 Independent Spirit Awards. It also won the Grand Jury Prize at the Nashville Film Festival.

References

External links
 
 
 
 Take Out: Off the Books an essay by J.J. Murphy at the Criterion Collection

2004 films
Films about Chinese Americans
2004 independent films
Films directed by Sean Baker
2004 directorial debut films
Films set in New York City
Films shot in New York City
Asian-American drama films
Films about immigration to the United States
Chinese-language American films
2000s American films